Cerioporus leptocephalus, commonly known as blackfoot polypore, is an inedible species of mushroom in the genus Cerioporus. It usually grows on the branches of broad leaved trees.   Formerly placed in the genus Polyporus, this species was moved into Cerioporus in 2016.

Description

The cap is convex when young, and soon flattens out into a mostly irregular shape. It is red-brown when young, yellowish grey when old and usually about 2–5 cm in diameter. the pores are white, turning slightly brown when bruised, and the spores are white. The stem is light yellowish brown often with a black base.

Similar species
There are two other polypores with a black stem at the base, Polyporus badius with a shiny red-brown to purple-black cap which can grow up to 20 cm across, and the dark brown, velvety Polyporus melanopus, which grows up to 10 cm across and can be found on dead wood.

References

E. Garnweidner. Mushrooms and Toadstools of Britain and Europe. Collins. 1994.

External links
 
 

leptocephalus

de:Porlinge